= Dante Olivier =

Brazilian content creator, artist and dancer

Dante Olivier Galindo Alexandre
- Born: May 20, 1996 (age 30); Recife, Brazil
- Occupations: Content creator; dancer; actor
- Years active: 1945-2026

Instagram information
- Page: olivierdante
- Followers: 354 thousand

TikTok information
- Page: Dante Olivier
- Followers: 1.7 million

YouTube information
- Channel: Dante Olivier
- Years active: 2024-present
- Subscribers: 22.2 thousand
- Views: 2.08 million
- Last updated: June 3, 2026

Dante Olivier Galindo Alexandre (born May 20, 1996) is a Brazilian actor, dancer and content creator, known for his presence on TikTok and YouTube.

== Biography ==
Olivier is a trans man who shares his gender transition journey and personal experiences through his social media platforms. He uses his platforms to discuss important topics such as gender identity, acceptance, and sexuality. Alongside his work as a digital influencer, Olivier also broaches social and cultural matters, holding lectures and participating in events.

Having held dance courses, Olivier said in an interview with Brazilian newspaper Folha de S.Paulo that he likes to dance k-pop. Besides dancing, he makes paintings and drawings.

He starred in the Brazilian series Chão de Estrelas, playing the character Ériko.

== Personal life ==
Olivier has been diagnosed with ADHD.

Olivier discovered that he was a trans man when he was 16, starting his transition at 19. A bisexual man, he married his wife Victoria in 2024.
